The Orang Pulo language or Logat Orang Pulo is a Austronesian language spoken by the people of Orang Pulo who inhabit Thousand Islands. This language is a language that was formed because of the mixing of many languages in Indonesia such as Mandar, Bugis, Madurese and Tidung.

History
The inhabitants of the Thousand Islands are believed to have formed and originated from the Panggang Island. And after the settlements in the Thousand Islands expanded, then the distribution of the population and culture was carried out from one island to another, such as Pari Island, Untung Jawa Island, Tidung Island and a number of other islands.
 
The culture and characteristics of the "Orang Pulo" as the residents of Roast Island were called at that time were very different from those of the Betawi population, even though the area was so close to Jakarta. And also not similar in character to the residents of Bantenese even though some of the early residents came from Banten. The Panggang Island people tend to have their own characteristics and culture, which is a blend of Banten culture, culture and characteristics of the local population Borneo (especially Tidung and Banjarese), Mandar from Sulawesi, Sundanese, and with a bit of Betawi culture and character. The result of such a complex mixture resulted in a new culture as well as a new character, namely the character of "Orang Pulo", the term for the early residents of Panggang Island, which furthermore clearly shapes and forms the character and culture of the inhabitants of the Thousand Islands.
 
The result of a mixture of cultures that creates unique characteristics and cultures in the Thousand Islands is also seen in the style of language, their thoughts and movements. Their language style is louder in volume, like the people of Sulawesi, agile as well as agile as is typical of Banten and other Indonesian ethnic group characters. Likewise with the culinary naming Orang Pulo which has its own language style and sounds unique. For example, the mention of similar foods lontong and nasi uduk which is generally eaten for breakfast is called "selingkuh" ("having an affair" in English), serta fresh chili sauce for grilled fish called "sambal beranyut".

Pronunciation
The number of speakers of this language is approximately equal to the total population of the Thousand Islands. People in the Thousand Islands have a slightly unique style of speech. His accent sounds different from the language usually spoken by Jakarta residents on the mainland. Although in general there are many similarities, this accent is clearly different from the Jakarta accent which is popularly used in television shows. Pramuka Island people's tone of voice sounds more "up and down", the vocabulary used is also sometimes not easy to understand.

The term "Orang Pulo" is usually used for people from Panggang Island, Pramuka Island, and Karya Island. But in general, the Pulo people can also be applied to the Thousand Islands people in general, distinguishing them from the term mainland people which is the name for the inhabitants of the mainland of Jakarta. Panggang Island has also been touted as the oldest island inhabited by the community. Now the island is densely populated with settlements. In the past, the first generation of inhabitants of this island came from Banten, and Mandar from West Sulawesi.

In the book entitled "Orang Pulo di Pulau Karang" by Rosida Erowati Irsyad, Orang Pulo (people of the Thousand Islands) use Indonesian language with a Malay accent. The Pulo people are said to have strong voice articulation, distinctive language structure and vocabulary. There are four language styles. First, the style of the people from Kelapa Island (near Harapan Island) which is thick with long and wavy vowels. Second, the style of the people Tidung Island which is influenced by Tidung and Tangerang coastal. Third, the people of Untung Jawa Island who still have a thick Betawi accent on the mainland. Fourth, the Pulo people (namely the Panggang Islanders, Pramuka Islanders, and Karya Islanders) who are influenced by Malay and Buginese.

Vocabulary
The vocabulary used by Orang Pulo include;
atret: back off
potret: up
pangkeng: room
monro: rest
godot: embroidering thread

There is also a vocabulary that is similar to that used in other languages, but has a different meaning. Misalnya, pengentotan (in Indonesian, means "fuck") which means "unpaid debt", or "mbok" which means "older sister", also "trade" (not "trade" in English) means "none".

Then there is also the characteristic glottal stop. The glottal stop style is commonly known as the accent feature Cockney English, but the Pulo people also have. Glottal stop is a way of pronouncing a dead "t" with the larynx. Not only does the "t" sound off, but the "k" sound goes off as well.

Here are some examples of Orang Pulo style glottal stops. From Indonesian to Orang Pulo;

laut (sea) become lau'''
kunyit (turmeric) become kunyibelok (turn) become blengko'''
barat (west) become bara

There is also a change in the word "mau" ("want" in English) in Indonesian to "mao". in the Orang Pulo treasury, "timur" ("east") become "timor", dan "pohon" ("tree") become "pokok", "tidur" ("sleep") becomw "tidor".

Dialect 
The dialect of the people of Thousand Islands has far differences from the people's accent Betawi. However, not all accents apply to all islands in the Thousand Islands. The reason is, Pramuka Island has an accent that is more unique and different from the Pulo people in general.

The difference in dialect of the Thousand Islands community is very visible from their vocabulary and accent. The dialect used by the Pulo people on a daily basis is often referred to as Pulo dialect. The uniqueness of this Pulo accent is the glottal stop or the pronunciation of the letters "k" and "t" turns off.

The following is a list of dialects of the Orang Pulo language;

 Pulo Panggang dialect is spoken in the Panggang Island and northern Thousand Islands
 Pulo Pramuka dialect is spoken in Pramuka Island
 Pulo Kelapa dialect is spoken in Kelapa Island
 Pulo Tidung dialect is spoken in Tidung Island
 Pulo Untung Jawa dialect is spoken in the Untung Jawa Island and southern Thousand Islands

Footnotes

References

Thousand Islands
Austronesian languages
Malayo-Polynesian languages
Languages of Indonesia